Esteban Navarro Soriano (born 18 March 1965, in Moratalla) is a Spanish novelist.

Career
In 2011 Soriano earned numerous sales successes with the national police trilogy Moisés Guzmán, protagonist to date of three novels: El Buen Padre, Los fresones rojos and Los ojos del escritor. Ediciones B has acquired the rights to publish the novel La casa de enfrente, work in the digital edition went on to achieve top sales for several months and has been published on paper in Spain and South America for Ediciones B. In September 2013 he became the best-selling novel on Amazon Mexico, reaching number one authors ahead of the likes of Dan Brown.

In January 2013, he was a finalist in the 69th edition of the Premio Nadal with the novel La noche de los peones.

He has won awards for his 2008 novella I Katharis and his 2011 novel The Stone Raft He has also been nominated for other awards.

Navarro is a promoter and organizer of various literary contests, and a jury member of several literary contests based in Huesca. There are articles written by him in newspapers such as Diario del AltoAragón and El País.

Personal life
Navarro has been based in Huesca since 2001.

List of works
2023 Medianoche
2022 La cuarta memoria
2021 Un año de prácticas
2020 El altruista
2020 Rock Island
2020 Verdugos
2020 Natasha
2019 El ajedrecista
2019 La rubia del Tívoli
2019 El cónsul infiltrado
2018 El apagón
2018 Penumbra
2017 El club de la élite
2017 La marca del pentágono
2017 Una historia de policías
2016 El reactor de Bering
2016 Ángeles de granito
2015 La gárgola de Otín
2015 Los ojos del escritor
2015 El buen padre
2014 La puerta vacía
2014 Diez días de julio
2013 Los fresones rojos
2013 Los crímenes del abecedario
2012 La noche de los peones 
2011 La casa de enfrente

Awards won
 2013. VIII Award short story Ciudad de Caspe
 2013. XXII Story Award Manuel Barbadillo Ateneo de Sanlúcar de Barrameda (Accésit)
 2013. Finalist 69th Edition Premio Nadal Barcelona
 2012. Novel Contest IV city of Almeria Almería
 2012. II Concurso Literario de Relato Breve Paperblanks Dublín
 2011. Certamen de Novela Saramago La balsa de piedra San Bartolomé (Las Palmas)
 2011. III Concurso literario policía y cultura de Huesca Huesca
 2011. V Concurso de Relatos Cortos Ciudad de Huesca Huesca
 2011 VII Concurso Literario de Relato Corto Ciudad de Caspe Caspe
 2011. IV muestra Criptshow festival de relato de terror, fantasía y ciencia ficción Badalona
 2011. XXVII Story Contest Villa de Mazarrón-Antonio Segado del Olmo Mazarrón
 2011 XIV Certamen de Relato Corto de Altorricón Altorricón
 2010. XV Certamen de Cuentos Navideños de Ampuero Ampuero
 2010. Casting Literario de Novela Fantástica de OnLine Studio Productions Madrid
 2010. IV Concurso Literario de Relato Corto Ciudad de Caspe Caspe
 2010. Primer Certamen de novela Escribiendo Barcelona
 2009. XIII Certamen Literario Villa San Esteban de Gormaz
 2008. I Premio de novela corta Katharsis 2008 Revista literaria Katharsis.
 2008. II Concurso de Narrativa Corta Oscafriki de Huesca
 2007. X Premio de Novela Ciudad de Badajoz
 2007. XV Police Day Award Cáceres

Generación Kindle
Esteban Navarro is considered the creator of the term Generation Kindle, referring to writers who emerged on the Kindle digital platform. This "Generación Kindle" brings together authors who, although they are of different ages and styles, publish their works through Kindle Direct Publishing (KDP). The term has been embraced by the media to refer to all the authors who publish and succeed through ebooks.

Controversy 
In 2017, the Directorate-General of the Police opened an Information File of him in his capacity as an official of the National Police after having published his novel A history of police, although the author unlinked the file with the publication of this work.

This news had a lot of media coverage even in international newspapers, such as The Guardian.
In the indictment they pointed out that "some officials of the police station in Huesca" were worried that their activity in social networks would damage the image of the body to which it belongs.

References

External links

1965 births
Living people
20th-century Spanish novelists
Spanish novelists
Spanish male novelists
Spanish socialists
Magic realism writers
Postmodern writers
Spanish children's writers
Spanish male short story writers
Spanish short story writers
20th-century short story writers
20th-century Spanish male writers